Nerella Venu Madhav (28 December 1932 – 19 June 2018) was an Indian impressionist and ventriloquist. He rose to popularity imitating celebrities, politicians, local dialects, Nizams and was the first to perform at the United Nations headquarters. He started a diploma course at Telugu University, a first in the world. He is often regarded as father of Indian mimicry. He is also hailed as the pioneer and maestro of mimicry in India.

Early life
Nerella Venu Madhav was born in Mattewada, Warangal, Hyderabad state to an industrialist, Hari and Srilakshmi. His father had a great admiration for literature. He completed his matriculation in 1950, and joined Warangal Arts and Science College for bachelor's degree in 1952. The principal of the college, B. V. Ram Narasu was very impressed by his talent, and even presented him with ₹60 as scholarship for good conduct, despite opposition from some lecturers. He encouraged him to take up mimicry. As a young boy, he used to play pranks by imitating people in his village to perfection. He used to mimic the people who visited his house and friends.

Career
Venu Madhav started his career in 1947 at the age of 16. He rose to popularity, coming from a village, imitating celebrities, politicians, local Telangana dialect. He worked as a school teacher in Mattewad Middle School in Hanamkonda in 1953. He also started and worked as a Mimicry faculty in Telugu University. He loved Telugu, Urdu and English literature, and greatly admired Indian classical music.

He started his mimicry career with the voice of Telugu actor, V. Nagayya. He performed in Telugu, English, Urdu, Hindi, Tamil and also musical instruments. He has toured all over the world and was popular for imitating world leaders, Hollywood celebrities and background score. His mimicry of a scene in the popular Hollywood movie, Mckenna's Gold was legendary. His imitation of Pritviraj Kapur in Mughal-e-Azam; imitation of Karunanidhi's voice using only one English word 'gibberish' was also very popular. He used to imitate tall personalities, without offending them. He received their validation for his perfection.

He was the first mimic in the world who performed at the United Nations Organisation, New York City.

He was nominated as a Member of Legislative Council of Andhra Pradesh by the then Chief Minister P. V. Narasimha Rao in 1972 to '78. His birthday, 28 December, is celebrated as World Mimicry Day by some of his students.

He was encouraged by film producer, B. N. Reddy to act in films. He acted in 12 Tollywood movies like Gudachari 116 starring Krishna and Jayalalitha.

He wrote a book on art of mimicry in Telugu language called Mimicry Kala.

Other honours
An auditorium in Warangal is named in his honour as Dr. Nerella Venu Madhav Kalaa Pranganam. The venue hosted a mimicry festival on his 80th birthday, 28 December by Greater Warangal Municipal Corporation at Hanamkonda Public Gardens and was named in 2011.

Death
Venu Madhav died on 19 June 2018 at 10:30 AM in Warangal, after a brief illness. He lived all his life in Warangal.

The Government of Telangana accorded a state funeral, the Chief Minister announced the building of an auditorium at Public Gardens with his statue and an educational institute to be named after him.

Personal life
He married Shobhavati in 1975 and has two sons; Srinath and Radhakrishna; and two daughters, Vasanthi and Lakshmi Tulasi, a mimicry artiste and studied under her father.

Awards and honours
 Padma Shri for performing arts from the Government of India in 2001
 *Raja-Lakshmi Award in 1981 by Sri Raja-Lakshmi Foundation Chennai
 Kala Prapoorna title from Andhra University (Vishakhapatnam) in 1978
 Honorary Doctorates by Andhra University, IGNOU and Kakatiya University
 Lifetime Achievement Award presented by the Telugu Book of Records & Telangana Recordula Pustakam (The Book of Telangana Records) on his 83rd birthday, on 28 December 2015 at Hanumakonda.
 Gajarohanam by Tirumala Tirupati Devasthanam
 Greater Warangal Municipal Corporation (GWMC) has named a street in Warangal city after him
 Government of Telangana felicitation on Telangana Formation Day in 2018
 India Post honored by releasing a postal cover in December 2017

References

External links
 
 Viśva vikhyāta "Mimikrī" Samrāṭ Nēreḷḷa Vēṇu Mādhav, Book by Puranam Subrahmanya Sarma
 Govt. of India, Padmashri award winners of 2001

1932 births
2018 deaths
Indian impressionists (entertainers)
Ventriloquists
Recipients of the Padma Shri in arts
Telugu people
People from Warangal
People from Telangana